Protochelydra zangerli is an extinct species of chelydid in the extinct genus Protochelydra of Chelydridae.

References

Chelydridae
Extinct reptiles
Paleogene reptiles of North America
Eocene turtles
Prehistoric turtle genera
Fossil taxa described in 1973
Extinct turtles